The Bilozerka is a river in Ukraine, 84.8 km in length, a left tributary of the Dnieper. The Bilozerka finds its source in the village of Mala Bilozerka, Vasylivka Raion, Zaporizhia Oblast.

Cities and towns 
 Kamianka-Dniprovska

References 
 Географічна енциклопедія України: в 3-х томах / Редколегія: О. М. Маринич (відпов. ред.) та ін. — К.: «Українська радянська енциклопедія» імені М. П. Бажана, 1989.

Rivers of Zaporizhzhia Oblast